The Shanghai Rego International School was a private international school located in Minhang District, Shanghai, China. The school operated on the National Curriculum (UK), delivers the IB-Diploma Program to 16- to 18-year-olds and provides a learning environment for expatriate children aged 2–18. The school delivered the English National Curriculum from Nursery to Key Stage 5 (ages 2–18) which includes the ICGSE and A Level Programme.

To accommodate non-native English speakers and to facilitate the transfer back to the home country, the school offered a fully integrated Mother Tongue Programme in Dutch, German, French, Spanish and Chinese.

Location

Controversy

In 2012 it was announced that the school had been struggling to obtain the proper permits and authorizations from the local Chinese government. The owner of the school stated publicly that the teachers had been working in Shanghai with tourist visas for at least 6 months. Tourist visas only allow visitors to stay for 30 days and it is illegal to work in China while visiting with a tourist visa. He also admitted there were "difficulties" paying the teachers on a regular schedule, but the administration declined to provide details on what exactly these difficulties were. The school has since closed due to unpaid staff, including teachers, a bus company, catering, cleaning services and guards.

The government has stated that when the school's land-lease expires in 2013, it will not be eligible for renewal. This decision was made to satisfy the growing needs of the city, allowing Shanghai to create a new public school.

The pay dispute crisis continued into 2014, where by February, there were 40 students remaining.

References

External links
SRIS Official homepage
http://www.cityweekend.com.cn/shanghai/articles/blogs-shanghai/family-matters-shanghai/breaking-news-shanghai-rego-staff-faces-deportation-if-work-visas-not-obtained/
Shanghai Daily February 2014.
Shanghai Daily February 2014 -2

See also
 List of international schools in Shanghai
 Beijing Rego British School
 Tianjin Rego International School 

British international schools in Shanghai
Educational institutions established in 2003
Rego Europe Foundation Schools
2003 establishments in China